Muzaffar bin Nasrullah was the Uzbek ruler (Emir) of Bukhara from 1860 to 1885. His father was emir Nasrullah. Emir Nasrullah died in 1860 and was succeeded by his son Muzaffar. 

Having entrenched himself on the throne, Emir Muzaffar removed the senior officials appointed by his father from their posts, confiscated their property and appointed his loyal people in their places. However, Shakhrisabz became independent. With great difficulty, he suppressed the separatist movement in Gissar, Kulyab and Baldzhuan. During the reign of Muzaffar, a Persian by origin, kushbegi (prime minister) Muhammad-biy (1811-1889), enjoyed great influence. Having unlimited influence over Muzaffar, he was able to bring other members of his family to higher positions.

The beginning of the reign of Emir Muzaffar was accompanied by some successes in foreign policy. With the support of Bukhara, Khudoyarkhan came to power in Kokand. However, the internal weakness of the Bukhara Emirate soon came to light. Since 1868, the Bukhara Emirate was subordinated to Tsarist Russia. Despite repeated attempts to change military tactics and the support of Turkish military specialists, the Bukhara troops were defeated three times by the troops of the Russian Empire under the leadership of K.P. von Kaufman in the battles of Irdzhar (1866), Chupan-ata (1868), Zerabulak (1868).

From July 1868 until his death in 1885, the emir maintained peaceful relations with the Russian Empire. A number of Russian embassies were sent to him. The reception ceremonies for the ambassadors were carried out in the Uzbek language.

Emir Muzaffar himself honored the work of the poet Alisher Navoi and in 1872 presented the manuscript of Navoi's Divan to the British Queen Victoria. 

Emir Muzaffar died in 1885 and was buried in Bukhara. His heir and fifth son Abdulahad came to power.

References

Literature
 Akhmad Donish, Puteshestviye iz Bukhary Peterburg. Dushanbe, 1960.
 Bregel, Y. (2009). The new Uzbek states: Bukhara, Khiva and Khoqand: C. 1750–1886. In N. Di Cosmo, A. Frank, & P. Golden (Eds.), The Cambridge History of Inner Asia: The Chinggisid Age (pp. 392-411). Cambridge: Cambridge University Press

Emirs of Bukhara
1885 deaths
19th-century monarchs in Asia
People from Bukhara
1819 births